Radio One 97.5 (DXLM 97.5 MHz) is an FM station owned and operated by M.I.T. Radio Television Network. Its studios and transmitter are located at Brgy. Bañadero, Ozamiz.

References

External links
Radio One Ozamiz FB Page

Radio stations in Misamis Occidental
Radio stations established in 1992